David Charles or Dave Charles may refer to:
David Atiba Charles (born 1977), footballer
David Charles (Australian politician) (born 1948)
David Charles (hymn-writer) (1762–1834), Welsh hymn-writer
David Charles (minister) (1812–1878), Methodist cleric involved in Trevecca College and University College of Wales, Aberystwyth
David Charles (philosopher), professor of philosophy at the University of Oxford
David Charles (public servant), Australian senior public servant and consultant
David Charles (physician) (born 1964), neurologist
Dave Charles, British drummer, recording engineer and record producer

See also

Charles David (disambiguation)